In computing, Aemulor is an emulator of the earlier  addressing-mode ARM microprocessors. It was written by Adrian Lees and released in 2003. An enhanced version is available under the name Aemulor Pro.

The software allows Raspberry Pi, Iyonix PC and A9home computers running  to make use of some software written for older hardware. , compatibility with the BeagleBoard single-board computer was under development.

Development 

The software's existence was first reported around the time of the announcement of the Iyonix in October 2002. A demo version was released in February 2003, with the commercial release in March of that year.

Aemulor Pro was released in 2004. This added enhancements, including support for low colour modes, required by scorewriter Sibelius and many games. A version for the A9home was released in 2005. The software was exhibited at the 2006 Wakefield Show.

In 2009, author Adrian Lees posted on The Icon Bar, showing an early prototype of the software running on the BeagleBoard. Progress on further compatibility for the Raspberry Pi single-board computer was announced by Lees on the RISC OS Open forum in 2012. Developer R-Comp was reported in May 2012 to be hoping to make Aemulor available for its BeagleBoard-xM-based ARMini computer.

Features 

The software provides full 26-bit emulation for applications written in C and ARM assembly language. Support for running A310Emu is included, allowing users to further emulate earlier versions of the OS, going back to Arthur. , due to the memory remapping employed, native 32-bit applications are restricted to a maximum size of 28Mb while Aemulor is running.

The original release included an Easter egg, with a prize of an upgrade to the Pro version for the person who found it.

Aemulor Pro adds support for low-bpp screen modes, sound, hardware emulation of VIDC/IOC, an altered memory map and  filing systems. Some software, such as Sibelius, can be run both in the desktop and in full screen.

Compatible software

References 

RISC OS emulators
RISC OS emulation software
Proprietary software